The 2019 NCAA National Collegiate Women's Ice Hockey Tournament involved eight schools in single-elimination play to determine the national champion of women's NCAA Division I college ice hockey. The quarterfinals was played at the campuses of the seeded teams on Saturday, March 16, 2019. The Frozen Four was played on March 22 and 24, 2019 at People's United Center in Hamden, Connecticut. Quinnipiac University hosted the tournament, the second time that it and People's United Center hosted the Frozen Four. It was the third year that the Big Ten Network aired the championship game live and the second year the semifinals was aired live on BTN.

Qualifying teams 
In the fifth year under this qualification format, the winners of all four Division I conference tournaments received automatic berths to the NCAA tournament. The other four teams were selected at-large. The top four teams were then seeded and received home ice for the quarterfinals.

Bracket 
Quarterfinals held at home sites of seeded teams

Note: * denotes overtime period(s)

Results

National Quarterfinals

(1) Wisconsin vs. Syracuse

(4) Clarkson vs. Boston College

(2) Minnesota vs. Princeton

(3) Northeastern vs. Cornell

National Semifinals

Cornell vs. (2) Minnesota

(4) Clarkson vs. (1) Wisconsin

National Championship

(2) Minnesota vs. (1) Wisconsin

Media

Television
Big Ten Network televised the semifinals and championship during their multi-year contract to carry the event. It would end up being the last time they carried the event as the 2020 tournament would go on to be canceled, and ESPN would purchase the rights beginning with 2021.

Broadcast assignments
Women's Frozen Four and Championship
Chris Vosters, Sonny Watrous, and Margaux Farrell (BTN)

References 

NCAA Women's Ice Hockey Tournament
1